Sharanbash-Knyazevo (Şaranbaş-Kenäz) is a rural locality (a selo) in Michurinsky Selsoviet, Sharansky District, Bashkortostan, Russia. The population was 429 as of 2010. There are 3 street.

Geography 
Sharanbash-Knyazevo is located 20 km northeast of Sharan (the district's administrative centre) by road. Michurinsk is the nearest rural locality.

References 

Rural localities in Sharansky District